Cristine "Saka" Santanna (born May 27, 1979) is a Georgian beach volleyball player of Brazil birth. She is partnered in the 2008 Summer Olympics with Andrezza "Rtvelo" Martins.
Their nicknames mean Georgia in Georgian (Sakartvelo).  

Santanna and her partner Martins' most notable win came when they defeated a Russian opponent in the Beijing Olympics just days after a war between Georgia and Russia started.

External links
Profile at the Beach Volleyball Database

1979 births
Living people
Beach volleyball players at the 2008 Summer Olympics
Beach volleyball players from Georgia (country)
Brazilian women's beach volleyball players
Olympic beach volleyball players of Georgia (country)